Neville Shelmerdine (23 December 1909 – 2 September 1992) was a first-class cricketer who played one match for the Royal Air Force cricket team in 1945. A right-handed batsman and right-arm off break and medium pace bowler, Shelmerdine did not bat or bowl in his only appearance, which came against Yorkshire County Cricket Club.  

He also appeared for the Royal Air Force against Northern Command in a one-day, single-innings contest in 1944, although this wasn't considered a first-class cricket match. He made a duck in the match.

References

External links
 
 

1909 births
1992 deaths
English cricketers
Royal Air Force cricketers
Cricketers from Manchester